Equisetum ramosissimum , known as branched horsetail, is a species of evergreen horsetail (genus Equisetum, subgenus Hippochaete). It is not the same species as Equisetum ramosissimum , which is a synonym of Equisetum giganteum.

Botanists today recognize two subspecies. The type subspecies, E. ramosissimum subsp. ramosissimum, is native through much of Asia, Europe, and Africa, with an introduced population in the southeast United States. E. ramosissimum subsp.debile, sometimes treated as the separate species E. debile, is found in southeast Asia and some Pacific islands. The type subspecies has more obvious branching from the aerial stem than subspecies debile.

References

ramosissimum
Flora of Malta